Oxblood Ruffin is a Canadian hacker.  He is a member of the hacker group Cult of the Dead Cow (cDc), for which he serves as "Foreign Minister."  He is also the founder and executive director of Hacktivismo, an offshoot of cDc. Ruffin is active in human rights causes and is a vocal proponent of hacktivism, a term which he has helped to define.  He has participated in both technology and human rights conferences, both on his own and along with cDc. He also has written articles for The Register and .net. Ruffin is also an infrequent contributor to both the cDc blog and the Hacktivismo News blog.

External links
Archive.org snapshot of now defunct Oxblood Ruffin website
Cult of the Dead Cow website
Hacktivismo website
"Hacktivism:  From Here to There" - a paper presented by Ruffin at Yale Law School's Conference on Cybercrime in 2004

Canadian civil rights activists
Cult of the Dead Cow members
Living people
Canadian bloggers
Year of birth missing (living people)